Tegrimus Tegrimi (1567 – 13 March 1641) was a Roman Catholic prelate who served as Titular Patriarch of Jerusalem (1638–1641) and Bishop of Assisi (1630–1638).

Biography
Tegrimus Tegrimi was born in Lucques, Italy in 1567.
On 23 September 1630, he was appointed during the papacy of Pope Urban VIII as Bishop of Assisi.
On 7 October 1630, he was consecrated bishop by Luigi Caetani, Cardinal-Priest of Santa Pudenziana, with Antonio Ricciulli, Bishop Emeritus of Belcastro, and Benedetto Landi, Bishop of Fossombrone, serving as co-consecrators. 
On 1 March 1638, he was appointed during the papacy of Pope Urban VIII as Titular Patriarch of Jerusalem.
He served as Titular Patriarch of Jerusalem until his death on 13 March 1641.

Episcopal succession
While bishop, he was the principal co-consecrator of:
Sebastian Müller, Titular Bishop of Adramyttium and Auxiliary Bishop of Augsburg (1631);
Dionisio Tomacelli, Bishop of Castro di Puglia (1631);
Scipione Pannocchieschi d'Elci, Bishop of Pienza (1631); and
Felice Franceschini, Bishop of Andria (1632).

References

External links and additional sources
 (for Chronology of Bishops) 
 (for Chronology of Bishops) 
 (for Chronology of Bishops) 
 (for Chronology of Bishops) 

17th-century Italian Roman Catholic bishops
Bishops appointed by Pope Urban VIII
1567 births
1641 deaths